Bacon is an unincorporated community in Linton Township, Coshocton County, Ohio, United States.

History
Bacon contained a post office from 1858 until 1906. The community took its name from nearby Bacon Run.

References

Populated places in Coshocton County, Ohio